Leucoptilum is a genus of flies in the family Stratiomyidae.

Species
Leucoptilum bassleri James, 1943
Leucoptilum plaumanni James, 1943

References

Stratiomyidae
Brachycera genera
Diptera of South America